Marrou is a surname. Notable people with the surname include:

Andre Marrou (born 1938), American politician
Chris Marrou (born 1947), American news anchor
Henri-Irénée Marrou (1904–1977), French historian

See also
Marro (surname)